Shanker Mutt is a neighbourhood in Nallakunta, Hyderabad, Telangana, India.

Commercial area
The shopping area is good with corner grocery stores and others.

Sringeri Sharadha Peetam
The name Shanker Mutt is originated from the temple of Shankara. This mutt is the oldest of the branch maths of the Sringeri Math in Hyderabad.

Transport
Shanker Mutt is well connected by TSRTC buses.

The closest MMTS Train station is at Vidyanagar.

Schools
There are many good schools and Institutions like teachershive.com. There are many famous schools like Sri Gurudatta High School which was founded and run by Mr.sharma, and gurudatta coaching centre run by mr.seenu. Shankermutt is a home of many good colleges and engineering educational institutions like Vijaya ratna junior college which also offers best foundation based coaching for both IIT aspirants and Medical students and IIT study circle popularly known as Ramaiah's Institute.Nano Junior college is among the leading rank producers from the place.

References

Neighbourhoods in Hyderabad, India